Prosartes parvifolia (Siskiyou bells) is a rare plant species endemic to a small region in the Siskiyou Mountains of the United States. It is known from only 4 counties: 2 in California (Del Norte and Siskiyou) and 2 in Oregon (Curry and Josephine). The species has been considered by some authorities as part of P. hookeri but others accept Prosartes parvifolia as a separate species.

Prosartes parvifolia is a rather stout plant with densely hairy ovate leaves. It can be distinguished from P. hookeri because P. parvifolia has single-locule ovaries and anthers much longer than the filaments.

References

parvifolia
Flora of Oregon
Flora of California
Plants described in 1880
Flora without expected TNC conservation status